Nancy Nadel Chemtob (born Nancy Ruthanne Nadel; April 2, 1965) is an American family law attorney specializing in divorces of high-net-worth clients. She is the founder and partner of the law firm Chemtob, Moss, Forman & Beyda LLP.

Early life 
Chemtob was born on Long Island to a Jewish family. She graduated from Syracuse University in 1987, and received her juris doctor from University of Miami School of Law in 1990.

Career 
Chemtob opened her practice in 1997 and Susan Moss, who represented an opposing party in a previous divorce case,joined her in 2002. In 2009, Chemtob represented a woman in the first same-sex divorce in New York history, before same-sex marriage had been legalized in New York state itself. Among others, Chemtob represented Mary-Kate Olsen in her pandemic-era divorce from Olivier Sarkozy., Tori Burch, Annette Lauer, Bobby Flay, Star Jones, Diandra Douglas and Louis CK. Chemtob said she had received a record number of high-profile clients during the COVID-19 pandemic.

Chemtob, Moss, Forman & Beyda LLP was listed among the America's Best Law Firms by U.S. News & World Report in its 2022 edition. She has been profiled in The Financial Times, Town & Country, The New York Times, Hamptons Magazine, and The New Yorker.

Personal life 
Chemtob has three sons and three stepsons, and lives in New York City and East Hampton, New York. She met her first husband, Roland Chemtob, in 1985 (m.1993). She married her second husband, media entrepreneur Michael Kubin, in 2018.

References 

Living people
Jewish American attorneys
People from Long Island
American women lawyers
American lawyers
Syracuse University alumni
University of Miami School of Law alumni
New York (state) lawyers
20th-century American women lawyers
20th-century American lawyers
21st-century American women lawyers
21st-century American lawyers
1965 births